The 2014–15 Liechtenstein Cup was the 70th season of Liechtenstein's annual cup competition. Seven clubs competed with a total of 18 teams for one spot in the first qualifying round of the 2015–16 UEFA Europa League. FC Vaduz were the defending champions.

Participating clubs

TH Title holders.

First round
The First Round featured the twelve lowest ranked teams not having qualified for the semifinals in the last season. The games will be played on 26 August 2014.

|-
|colspan="3" style="background-color:#99CCCC; text-align:center;"|26 August 2014

|-
|colspan="3" style="background-color:#99CCCC; text-align:center;"|27 August 2014

|}

Second round
The six winners of the First Round, along with the two best ranked teams not having qualified for the semifinals last season (FC Balzers and FC Vaduz II (U23)), competed in the Second Round.

|-
|colspan="3" style="background-color:#99CCCC; text-align:center;"|30 September 2014

|-
|colspan="3" style="background-color:#99CCCC; text-align:center;"|1 October 2014

|-
|colspan="3" style="background-color:#99CCCC; text-align:center;"|14 October 2014

|}

Quarterfinals
The four winners of the Second Round, along with the semifinalists in the last season (FC Vaduz, USV Eschen/Mauren, FC Ruggell and FC Schaan II (Azzurri)), competed in the quarterfinals.

|-
|colspan="3" style="background-color:#99CCCC; text-align:center;"|4 November 2014

|-
|colspan="3" style="background-color:#99CCCC; text-align:center;"|5 November 2014

|-
|colspan="3" style="background-color:#99CCCC; text-align:center;"|31 March 2015

|-
|colspan="3" style="background-color:#99CCCC; text-align:center;"|7 April 2015

|}

Semifinals

|-
|colspan="3" style="background-color:#99CCCC; text-align:center;"|21 April 2015

|}

Final

References

External links
 
RSSSF

Liechtenstein Football Cup seasons
Cup
Liechtenstein Cup